An Acting Instructor is a person, usually well educated in theatrical arts, who teaches, or 'instructs', aspiring performers on various acting methods. One example is the French mime artist Jacques Lecoq, whose methodology has inspired several theatre practitioners including Steven Berkoff.

Acting